Doramba  is a populated place and a ward (ward no. 2) of Doramba Rural Municipality. It was a village development committee before 10 March 2017. At the time of the 1991 Nepal census it had a population of 3,640 people living in 664 individual households.

On 10 March 2017, local level body of Nepal restructured into 753 units, thus this local level unit merged with other VDCs to form Doramba Rural Municipality.

References

External links
Ward No. 2 of Doramba Rural Municipality

Populated places in Ramechhap District
Wards and electoral divisions of Nepal